FC Kiisto is a Finnish football club, based in the city of Vaasa. It currently plays in Kolmonen (Third Division).

History
Vaasan Kiisto was founded in September 1904 in Vaasa Finnish Gymnasiums gym hall, after members of Vaasa Workers Association saw a need for separate Gymnastics and Sports Club. Kiisto started to play football in 1908. In Finnish civil war some members of the club participated as a red guards and as a result club was dismissed from  Finnish Gymnastics and Sports Federation (SVUL) and as a result joined newly formed Finnish Workers' Sports Federation. In 1931 Club was dismissed by court as a communist organisation, after playing a friendly match against football team from soviet union. Club was re-founded in 1949 and football was taken again to club repertoire in 1954. In 1999 when football had become considerably big part of club activity, FC Kiisto was separated from Vaasan Kiisto.

Season to season

1 season in Ykkönen
26 seasons in Kakkonen
15 seasons in Kolmonen
8 seasons in Nelonen
1 seasons in Vitonen

2010 season
For the current season FC Kiisto are competing in Section C of the Kakkonen (Second Division).  This is the third tier of the Finnish football system.  In 2009 the team finished in fourteenth position in the Ykkönen and were relegated.

FC Kiisto a-team are participating in the Nelonen (Fourth Division) administered by the Vaasa SPL.

Current squad

References

External links
 Official website

Kiisto
Vaasa
Sport in Vaasa
1904 establishments in Finland